William Stuart PC (15 March 1755 – 6 May 1822) was an Anglican prelate who served as the Bishop of St David's in Wales from 1794 to 1800 and then Archbishop of Armagh in Ireland from 1800 until his death.

Family life
Stuart was the son of John Stuart, 3rd Earl of Bute (Prime Minister of Great Britain 1762–1763) and Mary Wortley-Montagu. There is a painting in the Tate Gallery in London of him aged 12 stealing eggs and chicks from a bird's nest.

He was educated at Winchester College and St John's College, Cambridge.

On 3 May 1796, William married Sophia Penn, daughter of Thomas Penn, and had three children:

Mary Juliana Stuart (died 11 July 1866) married Thomas Knox, 2nd Earl of Ranfurly.
Sir William Stuart (born 31 October 1798–died 7 July 1874) married firstly Henrietta Mariah Sarah, daughter of Admiral Sir Charles Pole, 1st Baronet, and married secondly Georgiana, daughter of General Frederick Nathaniel Walker.
Henry Stuart (born 1804–died 26 October 1854, Kempston, Bedfordshire).

Episcopal ministry

In 1793 he was appointed Canon of the fourth stall at St George's Chapel, Windsor Castle, a position he held until 1800.

He was consecrated Bishop of St David's on 12 January 1794. Six years later, he was nominated Archbishop of Armagh on 30 October 1800 and appointed by letters patent on 22 November 1800.

Death

He died in London on 6 May 1822, aged 67, as a result of having accidentally taken an improper medicine.

He was buried at his family's seat, Luton Hoo in Bedfordshire.

In St Patrick's Anglican Cathedral in Armagh there is a full-length marble figure of the Archbishop in the attitude of prayer, sculpted by Sir Francis Chantrey.  Beneath it is the following Latin inscription: 
M. S. / Reverendissimi in Christo patris / GULIELMI STUART, S T P. / per annos xxii hujusce Ecclesiæ / Archiepiscopi. / Hoc monumentum / Clerici Armachani / pio functi munere / posuerunt. / Obiit anno salutis MDCCCXXII / Ætat. Suæ Ixviii.
In sacred memory of the most reverend father in Christ, William Stuart STP, for 22 years archbishop of this church. The clergy of Armagh, making a pious offering, placed this monument. He died in the year of grace 1822, in the 68th year of his age.

References

1755 births
1822 deaths
Alumni of St John's College, Cambridge
Bishops of St Davids
Anglican archbishops of Armagh
Children of prime ministers of the United Kingdom
Canons of Windsor
18th-century Welsh Anglican bishops
19th-century Anglican archbishops
Younger sons of earls
Younger sons of barons
William
Members of the Privy Council of Ireland
British expatriate archbishops